Cold Spring Township is located in Shelby County, Illinois. As of the 2010 census, its population was 442 and it contained 186 housing units.

Geography

Adjacent townships
 Tower Hill Township (north)
 Rose Township (northeast)
 Lakewood Township (east)
 Dry Point Township (southeast)
 Herrick Township (south)
 Oconee Township (southwest and west)
 Pana Township, Christian County (northwest)

Demographics

References

External links
City-data.com
Illinois State Archives

Townships in Shelby County, Illinois
Townships in Illinois